Daphnella degrangei is an extinct species of sea snail, a marine gastropod mollusc in the family Raphitomidae.

Description
The length of the shell attains 11 mm.

Distribution
Fossils of this marine species were found in Miocene strata in Aquitaine, France.

References

 Cossmann, Maurice. Sur quelques formes nouvelles ou peu connues des faluns du Bordelais... Au secrétariat de l'Association, 1894.

External links
 Fossilshells.nl: Daphnella degrangei

degrangei
Gastropods described in 1894